Psychoanalysis is a set of theories and therapeutic techniques that deal in part with the unconscious mind, and which together form a method of treatment for mental disorders.

A
 Acathexis
 Afterwardsness
 Anal eroticism
 Anal expulsiveness
 Anal retentiveness
 Anticathexis
 Antinarcissism
 Aphanisis

B
 Basic hostility
 Body cathexis

C
 Cassandra (metaphor)
 Catharsis
 Cathexis
 Censorship (psychoanalysis)
 Complex (psychology)
 Condensation (psychology)
 Construction (psychoanalysis)
 Counterphobic attitude

D
 Death drive
 Decathexis
 Decompensation
 Defence mechanism
 Deferred obedience
 Delayed gratification
 Demand (psychoanalysis)
 Displacement (psychology)
 Drive theory

E
 Electra complex
 Eros (concept)

F
 Fixation (psychology)
 Foreclosure (psychoanalysis)
 Four discourses
 Freudian slip

G
 Gaze
 Gender inequality
 Graph of desire

I
 Id, ego and super-ego
 Identification (psychology)
 Identification with the Aggressor
 The Imaginary (psychoanalysis)
 Intellectualization
 Interpellation (philosophy)
 Introjection
 Inversive

J
 Jocasta complex
 Jointness (psychodynamics)
 Jouissance

L
 Lack (psychoanalysis)
 Laius complex
 Lapsus
 Libido
 Love and hate (psychoanalysis)

M
 Madonna–whore complex
 Matheme
 Medusa complex
 Mirror stage
 Mortido

N
 Name of the Father
 Narcissistic defences
 Narcissistic elation
 Narcissistic injury
 Narcissistic mortification
 Narcissistic neurosis
 Narcissistic personality disorder
 Narcissistic supply
 Narcissistic withdrawal
 Negative transference

O
 Objet petit a
 Oceanic feeling
 Oedipus complex
 Ophelia complex
 Organ language
 Overdetermination

P
 Pansexuality
 Parataxic distortion
 Parataxical Integration
 Penis envy
 Phaedra complex
 Pleasure principle (psychology)
 Polymorphous perversity
 Postponement of affect
 Preconscious
 Primal scene
 Projective identification
 Psychic apparatus
 Psychical inertia
 Psychological projection
 Repression (psychoanalysis)
 Psychological resistance

R
 Rationalization (psychology)
 Reaction formation
 The Real
 Regression (psychology)
 Reparation (psychoanalysis)
 Repetition compulsion
 Repressed memory
 Resistance (psychoanalysis)

S
 Screen memory
 Self-envy
 Signorelli parapraxis
 Sinthome
 Sublimation (psychology)
 Symbolic equation
 The Symbolic

T
 Taboo
 Transference
 Transference neurosis
 True self and false self

U
 Uncanny
 Unconscious cognition
 Unconscious mind
 Undoing (psychology)

Y
 Vanishing mediator

See also
 Glossary of psychiatry

References

Psychoanalysis
Terminology
Psychological concepts
Wikipedia glossaries using unordered lists